The University of Montenegro Faculty of Applied Physiotherapy (Montenegrin: Fakultet primijenjene fizioterapije Факултет примијењене физиотерапије) is one of the educational institutions of the University of Montenegro. The building is located in Igalo, and the Faculty is the only physical therapy school in Montenegro and the region.

History 

In 1976, the High School of Physiotherapy was founded in Igalo as a two-year post-secondary school.

In compliance with the new Law on Higher Education, the Post-secondary School of Physiotherapy was transformed into a Higher School of Physiotherapy in 2004 and one year later was renamed the Faculty of Applied Physiotherapy as an organizational unit of the University of Montenegro.

References 

Applied Physiotherapy
Herceg Novi
Faculty of Applied Physiotherapy
Montenegro
2000s establishments in Montenegro
2005 establishments in Serbia and Montenegro